Derazi (also Romanized as Derāzī; also known as Bunneh Darāzi and Bunneh-ye Darājī) is a village in Khvormuj Rural District, in the Central District of Dashti County, Bushehr province, Iran. At the 2006 census, its population was 857 in 221 households. The following census in 2011 counted 1,070 people in 321 households. The latest census in 2016 showed a population of 892 people in 300 households; it was the largest village in its rural district.

References 

Populated places in Dashti County